Mount Pleasant High School (MPHS) is a public secondary school located in unincorporated New Castle County, Delaware, United States. MPHS was the first public high school in Delaware to offer the International Baccalaureate program.

History
After Delaware passed the Free School Act in 1829, the state began pulling together their first public school system; the very first school in Mount Pleasant, located in School District #2, was built soon after. The original schoolhouse still stands today and is located on an acre of land now part of Bellevue State Park. The community continued to grow and required a larger school, so in 1865, a new building was built near Mount Pleasant Methodist Church. This new school taught grades one through eight and gradually added nine through twelve as the students aged. 

In 1932, they required even more space; what is now Mount Pleasant Elementary School was built to accommodate the still-growing population and named the Mount Pleasant School. However, only grades one through nine were offered. By 1947, enough families had moved into the area that a separate four-year high school had become a necessity, so Mount Pleasant School transitioned into Mount Pleasant Senior High School and the lower grades were split between Silverside and Edgemoore Elementary Schools. Construction of a new high school building began in 1953 and, in September 1958, MPHS moved to its current location on Washington.

The school celebrated its 175th anniversary in a series of events during homecoming weekend, October 14 and 15, 2005, including the inaugural Mount Pleasant Hall of Fame.

Academics
In 2021, U.S. News & World Report ranked MPHS #2,885 of more than 24,000 high schools nationally.

MPHS' graduation rate for the 2018–2019 academic year was 90%.

Athletics
MPHS competes in the Blue Hen Conference, Flight A.

Activities
Mount Pleasant is home to WMPH 91.7 FM, which began broadcasting on October 1, 1969, and was Delaware's only public high school radio station until Thomas McKean High School began broadcasting at WHMS 88.1 FM in 1998.

Notable alumni
Dottie Leonard Miller (b. 1945), business executive specializing in Christian music
Kathy Jennings (b. 1952), lawyer and the Attorney General of Delaware since 2019
Patricia Blevins (b. 1954), former member and President pro tempore of the Delaware Senate
John Dossett (b. 1958), actor and singer
John Kaplan (b. 1959), Pulitzer Prize-winning photographer
Seth Van Neerden (b. 1968), former competitive swimmer and 1995 Pan American gold medalist
Bang Bang (b. 1985), celebrity tattoo artist

References

External links
 

High schools in New Castle County, Delaware
Educational institutions established in 1830
Public high schools in Delaware
1830 establishments in Delaware